The 2016–17 División de Honor Juvenil de Fútbol season is the 31st since its establishment. The regular season began on 4 September 2016 and ends on 9 April 2017.

Competition format
The champion of each group and the best runner-up will play in the 2017 Copa de Campeones and the Copa del Rey.
The other six runners-up and the two best third-placed teams qualify for the Copa del Rey.
In each group, at least four teams (thirteenth placed on down) will be relegated to Liga Nacional.
The champion of the Copa de Campeones will get a place for the 2017–18 UEFA Youth League.

League tables

Group I

Group II

Group III

Group IV

Group V

Group VI

Group VII

Ranking of second-placed teams
In teams with groups with more than 16 teams, matches against the teams placed 17th and 18th in each of the groups would not be included in the ranking of the second-placed teams. The best runner-up will qualify for the Copa de Campeones.

The seven best runners-up are determined by the following parameters, in this order:
 Highest number of points
 Goal difference
 Highest number of goals scored

Ranking of third-placed teams
In teams with groups with more than 16 teams, matches against the teams placed 17th and 18th in each of the groups would not be included in the ranking of the third-placed teams. The two best third-placed will qualify for the Copa del Rey.

The seven best third-placed are determined by the following parameters, in this order:
 Highest number of points
 Goal difference
 Highest number of goals scored

Copa de Campeones
The seven group champions and the best runner-up were qualified to this competition whose winner will play the 2017–18 UEFA Youth League. The draw was held at the headquarters of the Galician Football Federation on 11 April 2017.

The quarterfinals will be played in Ribadumia and Portonovo, Pontevedra, while the semifinals and the finals at Estadio O Couto, in Ourense.

Quarter-finals

Semifinals

Final

Details

See also
2017 Copa del Rey Juvenil

References

External links
Royal Spanish Football Federation

División de Honor Juvenil de Fútbol seasons
Juvenil